Nikolaos Petimezas or Petmezas (1790–1865) was a Greek revolutionary leader during the Greek War of Independence, politician and officer of the Hellenic Gendarmerie.

Life
Nikolaos Petimezas hailed from the important  clan of the Petimezas or Petmezas from the village of Soudena, near Kalavryta. He was born in 1790 as the son of Athanasios Petimezas.

After his father was murdered in 1804 he fled to British-held Zakynthos, and enrolled in the British-sponsored Greek light infantry units there, along with his brother Vasileios.

He returned to the Peloponnese at the outbreak of the Greek War of Independence, and fought in several battles at Kalavryta, Levidi, Corinth, Argos, and Akrata. In 1826, with 600 men, he and his brother occupied Mega Spilaio and drove back the attacks of Ibrahim Pasha of Egypt. He then fought in Attica under Georgios Karaiskakis against Reşid Mehmed Pasha. He reached the rank of lieutenant general.

He died in Kalavryta in 1865.

References

Sources
''This article is translated and is based from the article at the Greek Wikipedia (el:Main Page)
 

1790 births
1865 deaths
Greek military leaders of the Greek War of Independence
Nikolaos
1st Regiment Greek Light Infantry officers
People from Kalavryta
Hellenic Army lieutenant generals